The Three Crowned rulers, or the Three Glorified by Heaven, or World of the Three or The Tamil Kings, primarily known as Muvendar, refers to the triumvirate of Chera, Chola and Pandya who dominated the politics of the ancient Tamil country, Tamilakam, from their three Nadu (countries) of Chola Nadu, Pandya Nadu (present day Madurai and Tirunelveli) and Chera Nadu (present day  Kerala and some parts of Tamilnadu) in southern India. They signalled a time of integration and political identity for the Tamil people. They frequently waged war against one another under a period of instability and between each other, held control over Greater Tamilakam from 6th century BCE to the 13th century.

Origins 
They are mentioned by Megasthenes and the Edicts of Ashoka, and first in Tolkappiyam among Tamil literature who was the first to call them Three Glorified by Heaven. Ptolemy and the Periplus of the Erythraean Sea mention three kingdoms ruling Tamilakam.

Pandyas 

The Pandyas were the earliest of the Muvendhar and were of high antiquity being mentioned by Kātyāyana and Valmiki. However the establishment of a Pandya territory is not known until the sixth century under King Kadungon who liberated the Pandya country from the Kalabhras. Xuanzang reports that Jainism was flourishing while Buddhism was declining during this period. They were famous for being patrons of the Tamil Sangams which were held in their capital, Madurai. Pliny mentions the Pandya country and its capital. The large number of Roman coins from Emperor Augustus to Emperor Zeno found in Madurai shows that trade flourished among Rome, Greece and Tamilakam. Two embassies sent from the Pandya dynasty to Emperor Augustus were recorded. The Roman and Greek writers praise Korkai (now called Tuticorin or Thoothukudi) as the seaport of the Pandyas.

Literature 

The Silappatikaram alludes to the solar ancestry of the Cholas and the lunar ancestry of the Pandyas. It does not mention anything about the ancestry of the Cheras. The 15th-century Tamil Mahabharata of Villiputtur Alvar describes the Chera king as from the fire dynasty, retaining the solar and lunar origins for the Chola and the Pandya kings, respectively. The Tiruvilayatar Puranam (or Thiruvilaiyadal Puranam), possibly from the 17th century, also states that when Brahma re-created the world after a deluge, he created the Chera, Chola and the Pandya kings as descendants of the fire, the sun and the moon, respectively.

Chola Purva Patayam ("Ancient Chola Record"), a Tamil language manuscript of uncertain date, contains a legend about the divine origin of the three crowned kings. According to it, the Shramana king Shalivahana (also known as Bhoja in this story) defeated Vikramaditya, and started persecuting the worshipers of Shiva and Vishnu. After failing to kill Shalivahana with a rain of fire, Shiva created three kings: Vira Cholan (Chola), Ula Cheran (Chera), and Vajranga Pandiyan (Pandya). The three kings came to bathe together at the triveni sangam (three-river confluence) in Thirumukkoodal, and formed an alliance against Shalivahana. Next, they went through a number of adventures at various places, including Kashi and Kanchi. With the blessings of Durga, they found treasure and inscriptions of Hindu kings from the age of Shantanu to Vikramaditya. They then reached Cudatturiyur (possibly Uraiyur), where Vira Cholan wrote letters to all those who worshipped Shiva and Vishnu, seeking their help against Shalivahana. A number of people assembled at Cudatturiyur to support the three kings' campaign. When Shalivahana heard of this preparation, he marched towards the south and took possession of the strong citadel at Tiruchirappalli. The three kings sent their envoy to Shalivahana, asking him to surrender and renounce his faith. When he refused, they and their allies assembled an army at Thiruvanaikaval. From an inscription that they had earlier found at Kanchi, they realised that there was a subterranean entrance into the Tiruchirappalli fort. They sent a few soldiers who entered the fort and opened its Chintamani gate. Their forces then entered the fortress, and defeated Shalivahana. Chola Purva Patayam dates Shalivahana's defeat to the year 1443 of an uncertain calendar era (possibly from the beginning of Kali Yuga).

References

Bibliography 
 

Tamil history
Tamilakam